Joseph Bryan Park, also known as Bryan Park, is a public park in the city of Richmond, Virginia. The park was a memorial to Joseph Bryan (1845–1908), the founder and publisher of the Richmond Times-Dispatch newspaper. It was given to the city in 1910 by Belle Stewart Bryan and her family.

The park is open daily without charge. There is a network of hiking/biking trails throughout the park.

Bryan Park has been the venue for the Richmond Vegetarian Festival every year from 2003 through 2018.

Adjacent to the park is the Bryan Park Interchange, the intersection of I-95, I-64, and I-195

Azalea Garden
The Joseph Bryan Park Azalea Garden (17 acres) is a botanical garden specializing in azaleas, located within Joseph Bryan Park.

The azalea garden proper started in 1952 by Mr. Robert E. Harvey, a former Recreation and Parks Superintendent. Over some 15 years, Mr. Harvey and volunteers planted about 450,000 azalea plants (of 50 varieties) in more than 75 beds. They also constructed a small pond with fountain. Peak season is April 1 to May 15.

See also 
 List of botanical gardens in the United States

References

External links 

 Richmond Parks, Recreation, & Community Facilities information page
 Friends of Bryan Park

Bryan Park Azalea Garden
Virginia municipal and county parks
Parks in Richmond, Virginia
National Park Service rustic in Virginia
National Register of Historic Places in Richmond, Virginia
Historic districts on the National Register of Historic Places in Virginia
Parks on the National Register of Historic Places in Virginia